The following lists events that happened during 1907 in the Kingdom of Belgium.

Incumbents
Monarch: Leopold II
Prime Minister: Paul de Smet de Naeyer (to 2 May); Jules de Trooz (from 2 May)

Events
 Royal Belgian Hockey Association founded.
 24 March – Football season 1906-1907 ends with Royale Union Saint-Gilloise at the top of the Belgian First Division.
 14 April – Belgium national football team plays Netherlands national football team in Antwerp.
 21 April – Belgium national football team plays France national football team in Brussels.
 9 May – Belgium national football team plays Netherlands national football team in Haarlem.
 16 May-14 June – Ostend 1907 chess tournament.
 8 July – Scheldeprijs cycling race first organised by the Antwerp branch of the Belgian cycling federation
 23 July – Port of Zeebrugge formally opened.
 16 October – Copyright convention with Germany agreed in Brussels; ratified May 1908.
 18 October – Belgium a signatory to the Hague Convention of 1907
 26 October – Ratification of the German-Belgian railway convention of 1903.

Publications
Periodicals
 La Belgique Artistique et Littéraire, vols. 6 (January–March), 7 (April–June), 8 (July–September), 9 (October–December).

Books
 Jules Barbey d'Aurevilly, Le rideau cramoisi, illustrated by Armand Rassenfosse (Brussels, Edmond Deman)
 Félix Magnette, Les émigrés français aux Pays-Bas, 1789-1794 (Brussels, Hayez)
 Henri Pirenne, Histoire de Belgique, vol. 3 (Brussels, Henri Lamertin)
 Stijn Streuvels, De vlaschaard
 Joseph Van den Gheyn, Catalogue des manuscrits de la Bibliothèque royale de Belgique, vol. 7.

Art and architecture

 Henry De Groux, Portrait of James Ensor
 Léon Spilliaert, Self-Portrait

Births
 3 February – Charles Verlinden, historian (died 1996)
 17 March – Jean Van Houtte, prime minister (died 1991)
 19 March – Charles-Emmanuel Janssen, politician (died 1985)
 28 April – Raymond Braine, footballer (died 1978)
 22 May – Hergé, comics author (died 1983)
 24 May – Jules François, ophthalmologist (died 1984)
 11 June – Raoul Henkart, fencer (died 1955)
 2 July – Jean-Charles Snoy et d'Oppuers, politician (died 1991)
 11 December – Pol Duwez, scientist (died 1984)

Deaths
 8 January – Theodoor Verstraete (born 1850), painter
 21 January – Louis Willems (born 1822), immunologist
 7 February – Jean-Charles Jacobs (born 1821), entomologist
 19 June – Léon Herbo (born 1850), painter
 8 November – Marie Sasse (born 1834), soprano
 5 December – Charles Leickert (born 1816), painter
 31 December – Jules de Trooz (born 1857), prime minister

References

 
1900s in Belgium
Belgium
Belgium
Years of the 20th century in Belgium